The 2000 Maine Black Bears football team was an American football team that represented the University of Maine as a member of the Atlantic 10 Conference during the 2000 NCAA Division I-AA football season. In their eighth season under head coach Jack Cosgrove, the Black Bears compiled a 5–6 record (3–5 against conference opponents) and tied for seventh place in the conference. Ben Christopher, Paul Paradis, and Dwayne Wilmot were the team captains.

Schedule

References

Maine
Maine Black Bears football seasons
Maine Black Bears football